Martis ( or Maltis) is a comune (municipality) in the Province of Sassari in the Italian region Sardinia, about  north of Cagliari and about  east of Sassari. It borders the municipalities of Chiaramonti, Laerru, Nulvi, Perfugas.

Demographic evolution

References

Cities and towns in Sardinia